Rodica Radian-Gordon (born July 10, 1957, Bucharest, Romania) is the first female Israeli Ambassador to Spain and non-resident accreditation to Andorra, a position she has held since September 2019.  She’s also been ambassador to Mexico and non-resident to the Bahamas (2010–2015) and Romania (2003–2007).

Radian-Gordon has a doctorate in biochemistry from The Hebrew University of Jerusalem (1987), a master’s degree in National Security Studies from the University of Haifa (2001) and attended the John F. Kennedy School of Government as part of the Wexner Leaders Senior Program.

References

Diplomats from Bucharest
Israeli women ambassadors
Harvard Kennedy School alumni
Ambassadors of Israel to Spain
Ambassadors of Israel to Andorra
Ambassadors of Israel to Mexico
Ambassadors of Israel to Romania
Ambassadors of Israel to the Bahamas
University of Haifa alumni
Hebrew University of Jerusalem alumni
Romanian Jews
Romanian emigrants to Israel
1957 births
Living people